Shane Braddy (born 22 July 1960) is a former Australian rules footballer who played with Melbourne in the Victorian Football League (VFL). 

Braddy's brother Craig is a former leading footballer, playing for Fitzroy and Sydney.

Notes

External links 		
		
		
		
		
		
		
1960 births
Living people
Australian rules footballers from Victoria (Australia)		
Melbourne Football Club players